The First Battle of the Isonzo was fought between the Armies of Italy and Austria-Hungary on the northeastern Italian Front in World War I, between 23 June and 7 July 1915.

The aim of the Italian Army was to drive the Austrians away from its defensive positions along the Isonzo and Soča rivers and on the nearby mountains and hopefully capture the port of Trieste.

Although the Italians enjoyed a 2:1 numeric superiority, their offensive failed because the Italian commander, Luigi Cadorna, employed frontal assaults after impressive (but short) artillery barrages. The Austro-Hungarians had the advantage of fighting from uphill positions barricaded with barbed wire which were able to easily resist the Italian assault.

The Italians had some early successes. They partially took Monte Nero (Monte Krn), took Monte Colowrat, and captured the heights around Plezzo. However, they were unable to dislodge the Austro-Hungarian troops from the high ground between Tolmino and the Isonzo, which would later form a launching off point for the Caporetto Offensive. The heaviest fighting occurred around Gorizia. In addition to the natural defenses of the river and mountains, bastions were created at Oslavia and Podgora. The fighting at Gorizia consisted of street-by-street urban combat interspersed with artillery fire. Italian troops, such as the Italian Re and Casale Brigades, were able to advance as far as the suburbs but could get no further and were driven back. They made small footholds at Sagrado and Redipuglia on the Karst Plateau south of Gorizia but were unable to do much else.

On the Austrian-Hungarian side two commanders distinguished themselves: Major General Géza Lukachich von Somorja, commander of the 5th Mountain Brigade, who retook Redipuglia, and Major General Novak von Arienti who retook Hill 383 (overlooking Plave) with his 1st Mountain Brigade.

Early in July the commander of the Austro-Hungarian Fifth Army, General Svetozar Boroević, received two reinforcement divisions, which put an end to the Italian efforts at breaking through the Austro-Hungarian lines.

The final Italian gains were minimal: in the northern sector, they conquered the heights over Bovec (Mount Kanin); in the southern sector, they conquered the westernmost ridges of the Kras plateau near Fogliano Redipuglia and Monfalcone.

Involved units

See also

 History of Austria
 Italy in World War I

References 

 Österreichisches Staatsarchiv/Kriegsarchiv Wien
L'esercito italiano nella grande guerra (1915–1918) Volume I - IV / Roma: Ministerio della Guerra - Ufficio Storico, 1929–1974
Ministero della Guerra Stato Maggiore centrale - Ufficio Storico. Guerra Italo-Austriaca 1915-18. Le medaglie d'Oro. Volume secondo - 1916. Roma: 1923
Österreich-Ungarns letzter Krieg 1914-1918 Band II Verlag der Militärwissenschftlichen Mitteilungen Wien 1931-1933
Anton Graf Bossi-Fedrigotti: Kaiserjäger - Ruhm und Ende. Stocker Verlag, Graz 1977
http://www.worldwar1.com/itafront/ison1915.htm

Further reading
Macdonald, John, and Željko Cimprič. Caporetto and the Isonzo Campaign: The Italian Front, 1915-1918. Barnsley, South Yorkshire: Pen & Sword Military, 2011.  
Page, Thomas Nelson, (1920) "Italy and the World War". New York, Charles Scribner's Sons, Full Text Available Online.

External links
First Battle of the Isonzo, 1915 at FirstWorldWar.com
Battlefield Maps: Italian Front
11 battles at the Isonzo
The Walks of Peace in the Soča Region Foundation. The Foundation preserves, restores and presents the historical and cultural heritage of the First World War in the area of the Isonzo Front for the study, tourist and educational purposes.
The Kobarid Museum (in English)
Društvo Soška Fronta (in Slovenian)
Pro Hereditate - extensive site (in En/It/Sl)

Isonzo 01
Isonzo 01
Isonzo 01
Isonzo 01
the Isonzo
1915 in Italy
1915 in Austria-Hungary
June 1915 events
July 1915 events